Ben Howard (born 1987) is a British singer-songwriter.

Ben Howard may also refer to:
 Ben Howard (aviator) (1904–1970), American aviator and aerospace engineer
 Ben Howard (poet) (born 1944), American poet, critic and essayist
 Ben Howard (baseball) (born 1979), American baseball player
 Ben Howard (rugby union) (born 1993), British rugby union player
 Ben Howard (actor), British television actor in Oh! What a Lovely War

See also
 Benjamin Howard (disambiguation)